The Battle of Konna was a battle in the Northern Mali Conflict in the town of Konna in central Mali. Various Islamic fundamentalist rebels fought with the government of Mali, the latter of which was supported by French soldiers participating in Operation Serval. This battle was among the first French engagements in their intervention in the Mali War.

The fighting began when rebel fighters disguised as passengers on a public bus infiltrated the town. The bus was stopped at a Malian army checkpoint on the outskirts of Konna. As soldiers entered the bus to search it the Islamists opened fire, killing the soldiers. Additional rebels poured into the town. After several hours of fighting the Malian army was routed to its base, abandoning the town to the rebels and reportedly leaving several heavy weapons and armored vehicles behind. Around 25 Malian soldiers were killed.

An estimated 1,200 Islamist fighters advanced to within 20 kilometers of Mopti, a Mali military garrison town.

The battle ended in a victory for the Malian government and France, with rebel fighters ejected from the town.

Background
The January 1, 2013, the representatives of Ansar Dine pointed two main requests to the Malian government through Burkinabe President Blaise Compaoré, who mediated during the negotiations. Ansar Dine demanded that "the Islamic character of the State of Mali be proclaimed solemnly in the Constitution" and called for the autonomy of the Azawad. The Malian government refused. On 3 January 2013, Iyad Ag Ghali denounced in a statement the "bad will" of the Malian government during the negotiations and declared the suspension of his offer of cessation of hostilities. On the 4th, Ansar Dine handed over a document to the Burkinabè mediator and president Blaise Compaoré in which he called for the autonomy of Azawad and the application of Sharia law in northern Mali. But since 2 January, from the regions of Gao and Timbuktu, the jihadist forces of Ansar Dine, Movement of Oneness and Jihad in Western Africa (MUJAO), Al-Qaeda in the Islamic Maghreb (AQIM) and Boko Haram were gathering in Bambara Maoudé. On the 7th, about fifty of their vehicles passed Douentza and positioned themselves at Dangol Boré, facing the Malian army. For added discretion, jihadist pickups avoided forming in columns, instead opting to move in wooded areas in small groups in scattered formation so as not to be signaled by plumes of smoke. The pickups were camouflaged by being covered with mud and the fighters hid under tent cloths to escape the infrared visions.

Forces in presence
Malian forces expected to fight in the region of Mopti. The command was provided by Colonel Major Didier Dacko. Commander Abass Dembele headed the Malian forces of the Volunteer Commandos Group (GCV). Kassim Goïta, Gao's regiment, Elysé Daou, the National Guard and Captain Pascal Berthe, the artillery. The Malian forces consisted mainly of soldiers of the 62nd Motorized Infantry Regiment, as well as elements of the 35th Armored Regiment and the 36th Artillery Regiment. In December 2012, the newspaper Jeune Afrique reported that according to a military source more than 2,000 soldiers were present in Konna.

The number of Salafist fighters was not known precisely. Shortly before the offensive, the DGSE estimated that the jihadists were 1,500 near the demarcation line, including 300 men from AQIM and 500 to 600 from MUJAO. 30 pick-ups form the vanguard, supported by a reserve of 40 other vehicles in Douentza while 80 other pick-ups were ben detached to take part in the Battle of Diabaly. Malian services estimated the jihadist forces at about 5,000 men. According to a report from the French Senate on 23 April 2013, 1,500 to 3,000 jihadists were mobilized for the offensives in southern Mali. The strength of the Salafist rebels was initially estimated at 1,200 men according to RFI and Al Jazeera. On the night of 9 January to 10 January, a teacher near Dangol-Boré said he had counted more than 300 jihadist vehicles. For the reporter Jean-Paul Mari, the assailants initially gathered 70 vehicles around Bambara Maoudé then engaged 150, including 70 from Ansar Dine in the assault on Konna. For Laurent Touchard, the jihadist forces gathered north of the demarcation line were 1,500 to 2,500 men with 300 vehicles. Their forces were made up of some of the most seasoned and well-equipped combatants, with new recruits usually left behind to hold the cities.

Shortly before the attack, various chiefs met briefly at Lere Iyad Ag Ghali, emir of Ansar Dine, as well as Djamel Okacha and Abu Zeid who took command of the detachment which would attack the city of Diabaly. Iyad Ag Ghali was the main initiator of the offensive, the leaders of AQIM and MUJAO agreed to join but without enthusiasm, they had decided to consolidate their positions in the north. However, the Salafist objective was not known with certainty, two hypotheses are emitted by the DGSE. According to the first, the goal of the jihadists was to seize Bamako and take control of the country, according to the second the offensive was only aimed at the cities of Mopti and Sévaré and the international airport of Mopti Ambodédjo, the only airport in central Mali, whose takeover would greatly handicap the deployment of a possible international intervention.

The battle

Konna's capture by islamists
On January 8, 2013, jihadists were near the demarcation line in the Mopti region. Malian soldiers carried out some warning shots and reinforcements were sent. For their part, the fighters of Ansar Dine performed some artillery fired and rockets in the night. On the 9th, at the end of the afternoon, Lieutenant-Colonel Mamadou Samaké made a reconnaissance mission with a dozen BRDM-2 armored vehicles. The Malian soldiers do not meet any opposition from the jihadists and therefore turn around. But on the way home, they fall into an ambush. All of the Islamist forces crossed the line and attacked the city of Konna. The jihadists reached Konna in the night of 9 to 10 January. On the 10th, the clashes begun at 8:30 am and ended at 4 pm. The jihadists attacked from three directions, the first column attacked north, by the road of Korientzé, a village in the municipality of Korombana. A second column attacked to the east, by the road of Douentza, while a third bypasses by the south to cut the retreat of the garrison. To the west, the Niger River makes the area impassable.

According to the Malian government, a bus filled with infiltrated jihadists managed to enter the city. According to Jean-Paul Mari, around 1 pm, two buses entered the city after being controlled by Malian soldiers, but it turns out that the 14 occupants of these buses were AQIM fighters disguised as civilians. Arrived at a checkpoint in the middle of the military they open fire in the sixty soldiers before being in turn exterminated by the Malians. This version is also defended by Jean-Christophe Notin, it is however contested by Laurent Touchard, according to which "the aggressor tumbles while the identity of the passengers of the bus - true civilians - is being checked. The bus in question is also targeted by the men of Iyad Ag Ghaly. " Street fighting took place in the city, but Malian soldiers were overwhelmed, disorganized and ran out of ammunition, and their radio messages were intercepted by jihadists. Around 11 am, the Malians begin their withdrawal. The fighting lasted until 4 pm and at 5 pm the Islamist forces controlled the entire city. Outside the city, Lieutenant-Colonel Samaké, almost out of ammunition, also managed to retreat with his armored vehicles. Malian troops were in full retreat towards Sévaré.

Jihadist coalition advances in Sevare and Mopti and Operation Serval
However, the jihadist offensive in southern Mali provoked France's entry into the war. On January 11, the French army launched Operation Serval. Air forces were immediately engaged and from January 10 and 11, Special Forces soldiers transported by planes were dropped at Sévaré. On the morning of January 11, Mopti and Sévaré found themselves directly threatened. Only 70 French Special Forces soldiers held the Mopti Ambodédjo International Airport, while the Malian army deployed two T-55 tanks and three BM-21 multiple rocket launchers as artillery. If the jihadists seized Mopti, no more defense could oppose their progression to Bamako. Both sides also received reinforcements in the day of 11 January. On the side of the Malians, 300 soldiers "red berets" of the 33rd Commando-Parachutist Regiment with about twenty armored BRDM-2. The Ansar Dine fighters were reinforced by 500 men from MUJAO and AQIM. COS personnel in Sévaré also increased to about 100 men, mainly from the 1st Marine Infantry Parachute Regiment ( 1st RPIMa), the 13th Parachute Dragoon Regiment ( 13th DPR), the Air Parachute Commando No. 10 (CPA-10) and the Marine Commandos of the ESNO 43.

The jihadists then continued their progress and headed towards the cities of Mopti and Sévaré. In the morning, two Malian Mi-24 helicopters, freshly repaired, took off in Bamako and reached Sévaré. At the request of the French, they then go to Konna to attack a group of a hundred men spotted by an Atlantic-2 celebrating their victory. Around 9 am, the helicopters are in Konna and open fire on the Salafist fighters, they inflict losses but also kill some civilians. After their mission is accomplished, they then return to Sévaré. In the afternoon, the French in turn engage Gazelle helicopters from the 4th Special Forces Helicopter Regiment to counter the jihadist advance between Konna and Sévaré. Around 2 pm, two aircraft take off in Djibo, Burkina Faso, around 4 pm, they attack a group of pick-up jihadists. However the French fly low, without ground support and jihadists have anti-aircraft batteries on some of their vehicles. During the following firefight, a pickup truck is destroyed and its four occupants are killed by a HOT missile, however both Gazelles are also affected. The co-pilot of the first helicopter is seriously injured by a bullet from an AK-47, the aircraft manages to reach the nearest French military medical antenna, but the wounded French soldier, Lieutenant Damien Boiteux, then succumbs to his injuries. The second helicopter must land in disaster north of Sévaré, but the crew fires except and is recovered by the special forces on the ground. The French then withdraw to Sévaré after destroying their apparatus. Two more Gazelle helicopters are engaged soon after and fire with HOT missiles and 20 mm guns, a total of four jihadist vehicles are destroyed. The jihadists give up the fight and fall back on Konna and Douentza. Then in the evening, Mirage 2000D based Ndjamena in turn come into action. Two first aircraft take off around 19:15 local time. At around 10 pm, they dropped two bombs on a Konna building which served as headquarters for Ansar Dine. The building was ravaged and several vehicles at the entrance were destroyed. The planes continued their strikes and then bombard a logistics depot, then around midnight a second wave of Mirage destroys four more buildings. The fishing port, the military and administrative buildings, the sub-prefecture and its surroundings were particularly targeted.

According to local reports, the strikes killed at least ten people. Several Islamist fighters fled panicked. A big part of the mercenaries recruited by Ansar Dine disbanded. Some fugitives would have even drowned in the river. On 11 January, French Aérospatiale Gazelle helicopters armed with 20 mm cannons from the Special forces (4th Special Forces Helicopter Regiment?) stopped the Islamist column advancing to Mopti. Four Mirage 2000-D jets operating from a base in Chad also conducted airstrikes. 12 targets were hit by the Mirages during the night between the 11th and the 12th. The French chief of army staff, Admiral Guillaud, announced that the Islamists had withdrawn from Konna and retreated several dozen kilometres to the north. On January 12, the staff of the Malian army claimed the capture of the city of Konna. However, on January 15, French Defense Minister Jean-Yves Le Drian denies the information. On the night of January 12 to 13, the 2000D Mirages based in Ndjamena struck new strikes between Konna and Léré. As early as January 13, Konna began to be abandoned by jihadists according to testimonies of residents. The jihadists were positioned around the city. In the following days, some of them continue to appear in small numbers in Konna, mainly to obtain water and food. and 10 civilians were also killed.

A Malian lieutenant said that mopping up operations were taking places around Konna. French special forces were also reported to be on the ground. According to analysts, the French were forced to act sooner than planned because of the importance of Sévaré military airport for further operations. On 15 January, the French defense minister confirmed that the Malian military had still not recaptured Konna from rebel forces, despite earlier claims that they did.

Recapturing the Konna from the terrorists
On the evening of January 16, the French-Malian forces launch the offensive on Konna. 400 Malian soldiers commanded by Colonel Dacko leave Sévaré, supported by forty or so French Special Forces soldiers, including a dozen Marine Commandos of the 1st RPIMa. In the late afternoon, they clash with Salafist groups near Dengaourou village, located in a wooded area, about forty kilometers from Konna. The fight will continue throughout the night. Two Malian soldiers were killed at the beginning of the clash, including one by a sniper. However, the positions of jihadists were identified by the French special forces and reported to the Malian artillery, including multiple BM-21 rocket launch trucks. Salafists were crushed by artillery fire, a total of 14 of their pickups were destroyed. The jihadists retreated after several hours of fighting, but they were pursued by helicopters. Shortly before dawn, the two Mi-24 Malians attacked a group of twelve pickups and destroyed four. On the side of the French, a Tiger and a Gazelle neutralize two other vehicles. The losses of jihadists were unknown, only four bodies were found according to French soldiers, while a Malian captain told AFP the day after the fight that six Islamists were killed, eight of their vehicles captured and several destroyed. In view of the number of pickups destroyed, their actual losses were probably greater, with jihadists having probably taken away most of their dead. On the evening of January 17, French and Malian troops regained possession of Konna, abandoned by Islamist troops. The Malian forces entered the first, around 17 hours, followed by three French vehicles and four Malian vehicles that closed the march. The military is acclaimed by the people who brandish Malian and French flags. On the morning of the 18th, only eight Islamists were still in the city, four flee to Douentza by stealing two motorbikes, and the four others flee after threatening with their weapons young people who wanted to lynch them. The next day the city was entirely controlled by the Franco-Malian forces. On 18 January, the Malian army released a statement claiming to have complete control of Konna again. The claim was confirmed by residents of Konna.

Aftermath and casualties
The French report one casualty during the battle; Lieutenant Damien Boiteux, co-pilot of a Gazelle helicopter, fatally wounded on 11 January. On January 12, the Malian army, indicated in an initial assessment that 11 of its soldiers were killed and about sixty were wounded, it also estimated the Islamist losses to a hundred killed. However, this report is challenged by testimonies of residents who claim to have counted more corpses dressed in uniforms. According to the French colonel who commanded the special forces detachment at Sévaré, Colonel Didier Dacko told him on January 10 that his losses were 20 dead and about 60 wounded. According to a "regional security source" of the AFP, at least 46 Islamists died in fighting fought from January 10 to 12, while according to a resident of Konna dozens of bodies were left in the city. 6 other Islamists were killed in the night of 16 to 17 according to the statements of Malian officers. According to a report by Human Rights Watch, three child soldiers enlisted by the Islamists died during the clashes. On January 12, a merchant from Konna told Reuters that he counted 148 dead, including several dozen Malian army soldiers. Another witness, named Mohammed, claims to have counted 47 bodies of Malian soldiers in the city. According to residents of Konna, about 50 vehicles were destroyed by air strikes. According to some residents, 36 Malian soldiers were buried in Sama. 

ccording to a military source, 58 Malian soldiers were killed in the fighting. On January 14, according to a Malian newspaper, 101 jihadists, 11 Malian soldiers and a French pilot were killed during the battle. For the newspaper Nouvelle Libération, from January 11 to 14, the jihadists lost 130 men, including Firhoun, the adopted son of Iyad Ag Ghali, as well as 30 vehicles and 4 BRDM-2 destroyed. Among the dead was one of the Ansar Dine commanders, Abdel Krim, known as Kojak. Severely wounded in the fighting at Konna, he succumbed to his injuries in the Gao Hospital. According to other sources, Kojak would be Mohamed Ag Aghaly Ag Wambadja. On the 13th, contacted by Sahara Media, leaders of Ansar Dine confirm that Kojak and four of his fighters were killed on January 10 during the fighting against the Malian military. On January 15, the Ansar Dine movement publishes a video that it claims to have filmed the day before in Konna. An Islamist leader, Abu El Habib Sidi Mohamed, who claims to be a member of Ansar Edine's communication commission, says the movement still holds the city and shows several armored vehicles taken from the Malian army. He states that only five fighters of his movement were killed and that seven civilians died during a French bombardment. On January 19, Ansar Dine claimed to have killed 25 Malian soldiers in Konna in the fighting on January 10 and also captured 11 vehicles, 6 tanks and a large quantity of ammunition, they also estimated that 60 Malian soldiers were killed, several dozen Other wounded, two French helicopters shot down and recognizes only a loss of 8 men in all fighting fought since January 10. However, according to Laurent Touchard, the "tanks" that Ansar Dine claims as taking were in fact armored BRDM-2 and BTR-60PB 3. According to Human Rights Watch, at least 10 civilians were also killed in the fighting on January 11 and 12, including three children drowning while attempting to cross the Niger River. Amnesty International sayd that at least five civilians, including three children, were killed by aerial bombardment on 11 January. For Jean-Christophe Notin, these five civilians were not killed by French air strikes but were shot by Mi-24 helicopters from the Malian army. In February 2013, Konna Mayor Ibrahima Diakité told that 15 civilians were killed and 19 injured during the Battle of Konna, he also estimated that at least 502 Islamists were killed. This last estimate is probably based on the testimony of a resident of Konna, who claimed to have been asked by the jihadists to help wash their bodies on the night of January 10, before the French intervention. He estimates that he counted 502 bodies which were then taken to Douentza. 71 people, wounded during the fighting in Konna, are sent to the hospital of Mopti according to the International Committee of the Red Cross.

Executions
According to Human Rights Watch (HRW), seven Malian soldiers, including five wounded, were summarily executed by Islamists during the capture of the city. According to local residents, several Islamist prisoners or suspects were killed by Malian soldiers in military camps in Sévaré, including wounded taken in Konna, witnesses evoke in particular a mass grave of 25 to 30 bodies or corpses thrown in wells. According to HRW, at least 13 people were summarily executed by Malian soldiers and five others disappeared between 9 and 18 January in Sévaré, Konna and the surrounding villages.

References

Mali
2013 in Mali
Battles involving France
Mopti Region
Mali War
January 2013 events in Africa
Battles in 2013